Greg J. Chalmers (born 11 October 1973) is an Australian professional golfer. Chalmers has played primarily on the PGA Tour of Australasia and PGA Tour. He is a two-time winner of the Australian Open and late in his career eventually won a PGA Tour event, the 2016 Barracuda Championship.

Amateur career 
Chalmers was born in Sydney. He won the 1993 Australian Amateur and the 1994 French Amateur.

Professional career 
Chalmers turned professional in 1995 and made a strong start to his professional career, winning four times in Australia in the next few years, including the 1998 Australian Open. In Europe he won the second-tier Challenge Tour's Challenge Tour Championship, in 1997 and finished 25th on the European Tour Order of Merit in 1998. The same year he finished fourth at 1998 PGA Tour Qualifying School to win a PGA Tour card for 1999.

A poor 2004 season saw him lose his card, but he won the 2005 Albertsons Boise Open on the Nationwide Tour and returned to the main PGA Tour in 2006. Chalmers struggled in 2006, making only 8 cuts and did not maintain his status and played on the Nationwide Tour during 2007 and 2008. He finished 8th on the money list in the 2008 season to gain his PGA Tour card for the 2009 season.

In 2011, Chalmers won the Australian Open for the second time in his career, 13 years after he won his first. He held off late charges by John Senden and Tiger Woods to claim victory. He followed this up with a win at the Australian PGA Championship, to take the second Australian major of the year. He defeated Robert Allenby and Marcus Fraser in a sudden death playoff to take the title. These wins led him to win the PGA Tour of Australasia Order of Merit. He also became only the second player to have a chance of winning the Australian "triple-crown" but could not claim the Australian Masters title, an event that still eludes him.

In December 2014, Chalmers won his second Australian PGA Championship title in a sudden death playoff. He came from seven strokes back during the final round after a flawless round of 64 to enter a playoff with Wade Ormsby and Adam Scott on 11 under. In a marathon playoff which was the longest in tournament history, Ormsby was eliminated at the third extra hole, with Chalmers and Scott going as far as seven extra holes. On the seventh extra hole, Scott three putted from 30 feet for bogey to allow Chalmers to take the victory. This was his fifth title on the PGA Tour of Australasia and tenth overall professional level victory. He also claimed the year end Order of Merit title for the second time his career.

Chalmers started the 2015-16 PGA Tour season with only veteran member status and alternated between the PGA Tour and Web.com Tour. He earned his first PGA Tour win at the Barracuda Championship after 18 years and 386 PGA Tour starts, which was the most among active PGA Tour players without a win and one of the longest waits in Tour history. Chalmers and 2013 winner Gary Woodland were tied before the 18th hole. Woodland bogeyed the last hole and Chalmers eagled the par-five 18th, which meant a six-point victory under the tournament's Modified Stableford scoring system. Previously, his best PGA Tour finishes were second at the 2000 Kemper Insurance Open and at the 2009 Buick Open. At 42, Chalmers was also the season's oldest Tour winner. He is also only the 12th left-hander to win a PGA Tour event. Prior to his win, Chalmers was 229th in the FedEx Cup and 490th in the world. The win moved him to 231st in the world and earned him a two-year exemption that also included entry into the 2016 Open Championship as an Open Qualifying Series event after the Greenbrier Classic was cancelled. Chalmers finished 142nd in the FedEx Cup and did not qualify for the postseason, but the win made him fully exempt through the 2017–18 season.

Chalmers was unable to follow up his win and cut his 2018 season short due to arthritis in his back. He made no starts in 2019 and played with a Major Medical Extension until 2020, when he was unable to meet the terms and was demoted to the Past Champions Category.

Chalmers had a career best world ranking of 53rd in 2012. His career best FedEx Cup ranking was 35th in 2012.

Outside of golf, Chalmers runs a Dallas-area charity for autistic children called Maximum Chances, whose name is derived from one of Chalmers' sons.

Amateur wins
1993 Australian Amateur
1994 French Amateur

Professional wins (11)

PGA Tour wins (1)

PGA Tour of Australasia wins (5)

1Co-sanctioned by the OneAsia Tour

PGA Tour of Australasia playoff record (2–1)

Nationwide Tour wins (2)

Nationwide Tour playoff record (2–0)

Challenge Tour wins (1)

Australasian Foundation Tour wins (2)
1995 Western Australia PGA Championship, Nedlands Masters

Results in major championships

CUT = missed the half-way cut
"T" = tied

Results in The Players Championship

CUT = missed the halfway cut
"T" indicates a tie for a place

Results in World Golf Championships
Results not in chronological order before 2015.

1Cancelled due to 9/11

QF, R16, R32, R64 = Round in which player lost in match play
"T" = Tied
NT = No tournament
Note that the HSBC Champions did not become a WGC event until 2009.

Team appearances
Amateur
Eisenhower Trophy (representing Australia): 1994

See also
1998 PGA Tour Qualifying School graduates
2005 Nationwide Tour graduates
2008 Nationwide Tour graduates

References

External links

 Greg Chalmers player profile, Golf Australia
 Maximum Chances charity, which Chalmers runs

Australian male golfers
PGA Tour of Australasia golfers
European Tour golfers
PGA Tour golfers
Left-handed golfers
Korn Ferry Tour graduates
Golfers from Dallas
Golfers from Perth, Western Australia
Golfers from Sydney
1973 births
Living people